Burning Airlines was an American rock band from Washington, D.C. J. Robbins and Bill Barbot of Jawbox formed the band with Peter Moffett (formerly of Government Issue) in 1997. The band released two full-length albums, a self-titled 7", and split releases with At the Drive-In and Braid.

The band's name is taken from a Brian Eno song, "Burning Airlines Give You So Much More" from his 1974 album Taking Tiger Mountain (By Strategy).

History
Robbins and Barbot had jammed with Moffett while their band Jawbox was still active, briefly considering him to fill in after drummer Zach Barocas' departure. However, this lineup was not to be, and Jawbox called it quits shortly thereafter. Taking their name from a Brian Eno song, Burning Airlines released their first 7", and their debut CD Mission: Control! was released in 1999 on DeSoto Records.

Unable to tour full-time, Bill Barbot left the band and was replaced by longtime friend and Jawbox roadie Mike Harbin. This lineup toured extensively and recorded second album, Identikit, released on DeSoto Records in 2001.  Benjamin Pape was added as second guitarist/keyboards/vocalist. 

Burning Airlines was in the middle of a major North American Tour when the September 11, 2001 attacks occurred.  Many clubs refused to display the band's name prominently and the band considered changing their name but decided the name was still appropriate and had taken a new meaning and relevancy. The band then abruptly split up in 2002.

Discography

Albums
 Mission: Control! (DeSoto Records, 1999)
 Identikit (DeSoto Records, 2001)

7" Singles
 Carnival/Scissoring 7" (Desoto Records, 1998)
 Back of Love split with Braid (DeSoto Records, 1999)
 The Deluxe War Baby split with At the Drive-In (Thick Records, 2000)

Related bands
 Admiral – Michael Harbin
 Channels – J. Robbins
 Dove – Peter Moffet
 Forensics – Michael Harbin
 Government Issue – J. Robbins, Peter Moffet
 Jawbox – J. Robbins, Bill Barbot
 Report Suspicious Activity – J. Robbins
 Wool – Peter Moffet
 Jack Potential – Mike Harbin
 Office of Future Plans – J. Robbins

External links
By Any Other Name... Would Burning Airlines sound as sweet? — Copper Press 9 (2002)
Burning Airlines - BandToBand.com

Musical groups established in 1997
Musical groups disestablished in 2002
American post-hardcore musical groups
Alternative rock groups from Washington, D.C.